Linda Garcia Benavides is an American politician who served as a member of the New Mexico House of Representatives for the 17th district from September to December 2022. She was appointed to the position by the Bernalillo County Board of Commissioners in September 2022, succeeding Deborah A. Armstrong.

Career 
For 24 years, Benavides worked for Sandia National Laboratories. She was also a member of the executive board of the New Mexico Hispanic Heritage Committee. On September 7, 2022, she was appointed to the New Mexico House of Representatives by members of the Bernalillo County Board of Commissioners, succeeding Deborah A. Armstrong.

References 

Living people
Democratic Party members of the New Mexico House of Representatives
Women state legislators in New Mexico
Politicians from Albuquerque, New Mexico
Year of birth missing (living people)